Harry Lehmann (21 March 1924 in Güstrow22 November 1998 in Hamburg) was a German physicist.

Biography
Lehmann studied physics at Rostock and the Humboldt-Universität zu Berlin.

In 1952 he worked at the Max-Planck-Institut in Göttingen, and spent a year in Copenhagen and from 1956 worked in Hamburg.

In 1967 he won the Max Planck Medal  for extraordinary achievements in theoretical physics. It is awarded annually by the Deutsche Physikalische Gesellschaft.

The 'L' in the LSZ reduction formula refers to Harry Lehmann.

See also
 Källén–Lehmann spectral representation

Notes

References
Karl von Meyenn (ed.), Wolfgang Pauli. Wissenschaftlicher Briefwechsel, Vol. IV, Part III, Briefwechsel 1955/56, Springer Verlag, p. 68ff, Wolfhart Zimmermann Harry Lehmann, der Feldverein und die Anfänge der axiomatischen Quantenfeldtheorie (Hamburg 1999)

1924 births
1998 deaths
20th-century German physicists
People from Güstrow
Winners of the Max Planck Medal
Academic staff of the University of Hamburg
University of Rostock alumni
Humboldt University of Berlin alumni